Munnangi is a village in Guntur district of the Indian state of Andhra Pradesh. It is located in Kollipara mandal of Tenali revenue division. Munnangi also known as Munikotipuram.

Geography 

Governance 

Munnangi gram panchayat is the local self-government of the village. It is divided into wards and each ward is represented by a ward member. The village forms a part of Andhra Pradesh Capital Region and is under the jurisdiction of APCRDA.

Education 

As per the school information report for the academic year 2018–19, the village has 5 schools. These include 1 private and 4 Zilla/Mandal Parishad schools
1. Elementary School
2. Zilla Parishat High School
3. Vivekananda Vidyamandir
.

See also 
List of villages in Guntur district
www.munnangi.com

References 

Villages in Guntur district